Rénald Metelus (born 6 January 1993 in Levallois-Perret, France) is a footballer for CMS Oissel and the Haiti national football team.

Career
Metelus began his senior career in 2008 with the Le Centre Technique National Fernand Sastre (INF).

National
In 2009, Metelus represented in an international match for the French U-17 football team. In 2013, he represented the national team of Haiti.

Metelus also appeared for the senior Haiti national football team in a 3-3 2017 Kirin Challenge Cup tie with Japan on 10 October 2017.

References

External links

 

1993 births
Living people
People from Levallois-Perret
Haitian footballers
Haiti international footballers
French footballers
France youth international footballers
French sportspeople of Haitian descent
Championnat National players
US Avranches players
US Ivry players
ESM Gonfreville players
CMS Oissel players
Championnat National 2 players
Championnat National 3 players
Association football defenders
Footballers from Hauts-de-Seine